M.2, pronounced m dot two and formerly known as the Next Generation Form Factor (NGFF), is a specification for internally mounted computer expansion cards and associated connectors.  M.2 replaces the mSATA standard, which uses the PCI Express Mini Card physical card layout and connectors.  Employing a more flexible physical specification, M.2 allows different module widths and lengths, which, paired with the availability of more advanced interfacing features, makes M.2 more suitable than mSATA in general for solid-state storage applications, particularly in smaller devices such as ultrabooks and tablets.

Computer bus interfaces provided through the M.2 connector are PCI Express x4 (up to four lanes), Serial ATA 3.0, and USB 3.0 (a single logical port for each of the latter two).  It is up to the manufacturer of the M.2 host or module to select which interfaces are to be supported, depending on the desired level of host support and the module type.  Different M.2 connector keying notches denote various purposes and capabilities of both the M.2 hosts and modules, and also prevent the M.2 modules from being inserted into incompatible host connectors.

The M.2 specification supports NVM Express (NVMe) as the logical device interface for M.2 PCI Express SSDs, in addition to supporting legacy Advanced Host Controller Interface (AHCI) at the logical interface level.  While the support for AHCI ensures software-level backward compatibility with legacy SATA devices and legacy operating systems, NVM Express is designed to fully utilize the capability of high-speed PCI Express storage devices to perform many I/O operations in parallel.

Features 

M.2 modules can integrate multiple functions, including the following device classes: Wi-Fi, Bluetooth, satellite navigation, near field communication (NFC), digital radio, WiGig, wireless WAN (WWAN), and solid-state drives (SSDs).  The SATA revision 3.2 specification, in its gold revision , standardizes M.2 as a new format for storage devices and specifies its hardware layout. Buses exposed through the M.2 connector include PCI Express 3.0 and newer, Serial ATA (SATA) 3.0 and USB 3.0; all these standards are backward compatible.

The M.2 specification provides up to four PCI Express lanes and one logical SATA 3.0 (6 Gbit/s) port, and exposes them through the same connector so both PCI Express and SATA storage devices may exist in the form of M.2 modules.  Exposed PCI Express lanes provide a pure PCI Express connection between the host and storage device, with no additional layers of bus abstraction. PCI-SIG M.2 specification, in its revision 1.0 , provides detailed M.2 specifications.

Storage interfaces 
Three options are available for the logical device interfaces and command sets used for interfacing with M.2 storage devices, which may be used depending on the type of M.2 storage device and available operating system support:

 Legacy SATA Used for SATA SSDs, and interfaced through the AHCI driver and legacy SATA 3.0 (6 Gbit/s) port exposed through the M.2 connector.

 PCI Express using AHCI Used for PCI Express SSDs and interfaced through the AHCI driver and provided PCI Express lanes, providing backward compatibility with widespread SATA support in operating systems at the cost of lower performance.  AHCI was developed when the purpose of a host bus adapter (HBA) in a system was to connect the CPU/memory subsystem with a much slower storage subsystem based on rotating magnetic media; as a result, AHCI has some inherent inefficiencies when applied to SSD devices, which behave much more like RAM than like spinning media.

 PCI Express using NVMe Used for PCI Express SSDs and interfaced through the NVMe driver and provided PCI Express lanes, as a high-performance and scalable host controller interface designed and optimized especially for interfacing with PCI Express SSDs.  NVMe has been designed from the ground up, capitalizing on the low latency and enhanced parallelism of PCI Express SSDs, and complementing the parallelism of contemporary CPUs, platforms and applications. At a high level, primary advantages of NVMe over AHCI relate to NVMe's ability to exploit parallelism in host hardware and software, based on its design advantages that include data transfers with fewer stages, greater depth of command queues, and more efficient interrupt processing.

Form factors and keying 

The M.2 standard is based on the mSATA standard, which uses the existing PCI Express Mini Card (Mini PCIe) form factor and connector.  M.2 adds the possibility of larger printed circuit boards (PCBs), allowing longer modules and double-sided component population.  Consequently, M.2 SSD modules can provide double the storage capacity within the footprint of an mSATA device.

M.2 modules are rectangular, with an edge connector on one side and a semicircular mounting hole at the center of the opposite edge.  The edge connector has 75 positions with up to 67 pins, employing a 0.5 mm pitch and offsetting the pins on opposing sides of the PCB from each other.  Each pin on the connector is rated for up to 50 V and 0.5 A, while the connector itself is specified to endure 60 mating cycles. The M.2 standard allows module widths of 12, 16, 22 and 30 mm, and lengths of 16, 26, 30, 38, 42, 60, 80 and 110 mm.  Initial line-up of the commercially available M.2 expansion cards is 22 mm wide, with varying lengths of 30, 42, 60, 80 and 110 mm. The codes for the M.2 module sizes contain both the width and length of a particular module; for example, "2242" as a module code means that the module is 22 mm wide and 42 mm long, while "2280" denotes a module 22 mm wide and 80 mm long.

An M.2 module is installed into a mating connector provided by the host's circuit board, and a single mounting screw secures the module into place. Different host-side connectors are used for single- and double-sided M.2 modules, providing different amounts of space between the M.2 expansion card and the host's PCB. Circuit boards on the hosts are usually designed to accept multiple lengths of M.2 modules, which means that the sockets capable of accepting longer M.2 modules usually also accept shorter ones by providing different positions for the mounting screw.

The PCB of an M.2 module provides a 75-position edge connector; depending on the type of module, certain pin positions are removed to present one or more keying notches. Furthermore, M.2 sockets keyed for SATA or two PCI Express lanes (PCIe ×2) are referred to as "socket 2 configuration" or "socket 2", while the sockets keyed for four PCI Express lanes (PCIe ×4) are referred to as "socket 3 configuration" or "socket 3".

For example, M.2 modules with two notches in B and M positions use up to two PCI Express lanes and provide broader compatibility at the same time, while the M.2 modules with only one notch in the M position use up to four PCI Express lanes; both examples may also provide SATA storage devices.  Similar keying applies to M.2 modules that utilize provided USB 3.0 connectivity.

Various types of M.2 modules are denoted using the "WWLL-HH-K-K" or "WWLL-HH-K" naming schemes, in which "WW" and "LL" specify the module width and length in millimeters, respectively.  The "HH" part specifies, in an encoded form, whether a module is single- or double-sided, and the maximum allowed thickness of mounted components; possible values are listed in the right table above.  Module keying is specified by the "K-K" part, in an encoded form using the key IDs from the left table above; it can also be specified as "K" only, if a module has only one keying notch.

Beside socketed modules, the M.2 standard also includes the option for having permanently soldered single-sided modules.

Alternative standards 

Samsung introduced a new form factor called Next Generation Small Form Factor (NGSFF), also known as NF1 or M.3, which may replace U.2 in server applications.

JEDEC JESD233 is another specification called Crossover Flash Memory (XFM) for XFM Embedded and Removable Memory Devices (XFMD). It targets to replace the M.2 form factor with a significantly smaller one (also called XT2), so that it can also be designed as an alternative to soldered memory. XFM Express utilizes a NVMe logical interface over a PCI Express physical interface.

Gallery

See also 

 Enterprise and Data Center Standard Form Factor (EDSFF)
 List of interface bit rates
 NVM Express (NVMe)
 
 U.2

References

External links 

  (SATA-IO) official website
  (PCI-SIG) official website
 Understanding M.2, the interface that will speed up your next SSD, Ars Technica, February 9, 2015, by Andrew Cunningham
 LFCS: Preparing Linux for nonvolatile memory devices, LWN.net, April 19, 2013, by Jonathan Corbet
 PCIe SSD 101: An Overview of Standards, Markets and Performance, SNIA, August 2013, archived from the original on February 2, 2014
 M.2 Pinout Descriptions and Reference Designs, January 28, 2020, an application note from Congatec
  US patent 20130294023, November 7, 2013, assigned to Raphael Gay

 
Computer-related introductions in 2013
Computer connectors
Motherboard expansion slot
Peripheral Component Interconnect
SATA Express
Serial ATA
USB